2002 Belfast riots may refer to:
Holy Cross dispute
May 2002 Belfast riots
2002 Short Strand clashes